Alamarvdasht is a city and capital of Alamarvdasht District, in Lamerd County, Fars Province, Iran. At the 2006 census, its population was 3,502, in 811 families, and at the 2011 census, its population was 4,025, in 969 families.

History

Geography

Climate
Alamarvdasht features a hot semi arid climate, (Köppen climate classification: BSh). Due to annual precipitation is in the range of 50%–100% of the threshold, the classification is BSh (Hot semi-arid climate).

References

Populated places in Lamerd County
Cities in Fars Province
Alamarvdasht District

tr:Bayram, Fars Eyaleti